Samuel Harshany (April 24, 1910 – February 1, 2001) was a Major League Baseball catcher. He played all or part of four seasons, from  until , for the St. Louis Browns. After his playing career, Harshany managed several years in the minors in the late 1940s and early 1950s.

His surname has also been spelled Harshaney.

Sources

Major League Baseball catchers
St. Louis Browns players
San Antonio Missions players
Toronto Maple Leafs (International League) players
Toledo Mud Hens players
Austin Pioneers players
Del Rio Cowboys players
San Angelo Colts players
Harlingen Capitals players
Minor league baseball managers
Baseball players from Illinois
1910 births
2001 deaths
People from Madison, Illinois